MTAS may refer to:
Medical Training Application Service
The railway company Malmtrafikk
Ericsson's Multimedia Application Server Ericsson MTAS